Christopher Coles (born 14 July 1992) is a badminton player from England. He started playing badminton at age 6. He did a BTEC at Chippenham College, after year 11. In 2011, he won the gold medal at the European Junior Championships in the boys' doubles event with Matthew Nottingham.

Achievements

European Junior Championships 
Boys' doubles

BWF International Challenge/Series (5 titles, 5 runners-up) 
Men's doubles

Mixed doubles

  BWF International Challenge tournament
  BWF International Series tournament
  BWF Future Series tournament

References

External links 
 

1992 births
Living people
Sportspeople from Bristol
English male badminton players